Pepsi League may refer to:
Úrvalsdeild, the national Icelandic association football league, currently sponsored by PepsiCo, and known in Icelandic as Pepsi-deildin
2016 Mongolian Futsal League, also known as the Pepsi League, an inter-league futsal tournament in Mongolia
 Men's Division A of the Lebanese Basketball League, currently sponsored by PepsiCo